Walter Oberste (born 25 December 1933) is a German sprinter. He competed in the men's 4 × 400 metres relay at the 1956 Summer Olympics.

References

1933 births
Living people
Athletes (track and field) at the 1956 Summer Olympics
German male sprinters
Olympic athletes of the United Team of Germany
Place of birth missing (living people)
Universiade medalists in athletics (track and field)
Universiade gold medalists for West Germany
Medalists at the 1959 Summer Universiade